Mario Mijatović (born 24 October 1980) is a Croatian retired professional footballer who played as a forward.

Career
He had spells in Austria with Kottingbrunn, LASK and FC Lustenau.

References

External links
 

1980 births
Living people
People from Draž
Association football forwards
Croatian footballers
NK Osijek players
NK Grafičar Vodovod players
NK Belišće players
NK Slaven Belupo players
NK Kamen Ingrad players
LASK players
FC Lustenau players
Hoang Anh Gia Lai FC players
Steel Azin F.C. players
Kavala F.C. players
NK Olimpija Osijek players
Balmazújvárosi FC players
FK Kukësi players
Croatian Football League players
Austrian Football Bundesliga players
2. Liga (Austria) players
Austrian Landesliga players
V.League 1 players
Persian Gulf Pro League players
Football League (Greece) players
Nemzeti Bajnokság II players
Kategoria Superiore players
Croatian expatriate footballers
Croatian expatriate sportspeople in Austria
Expatriate footballers in Austria
Croatian expatriate sportspeople in Vietnam
Expatriate footballers in Vietnam
Croatian expatriate sportspeople in Iran
Expatriate footballers in Iran
Croatian expatriate sportspeople in Greece
Expatriate footballers in Greece
Croatian expatriate sportspeople in Hungary
Expatriate footballers in Hungary
Croatian expatriate sportspeople in Albania
Expatriate footballers in Albania